External pudendal artery may refer to:
 Superficial external pudendal artery, one of the pudendal arteries, it arises from the medial side of the femoral artery
 Deep external pudendal artery, one of the pudendal arteries, it is more deeply seated than the superficial external pudendal artery